Erika Stefania Pachito Jurado (born 29 July 1995) is an Ecuadorian boxer. In June 2021, she qualified to compete at the 2020 Summer Olympics in Tokyo, Japan, where she competed in the middleweight category.

Pachito started boxing when she was 18. In 2019, she won a bronze medal at the Lima Pan American Games.

References

Living people
1995 births
Ecuadorian women boxers
Middleweight boxers
Olympic boxers of Ecuador
Boxers at the 2020 Summer Olympics
Boxers at the 2019 Pan American Games
Medalists at the 2019 Pan American Games
Pan American Games medalists in boxing
Pan American Games bronze medalists for Ecuador
21st-century Ecuadorian women